Oldřich Navrátil (born 21 October 1952) is Czech stage, film and television actor. He has appeared in 75 films and television shows since 1976 and starred in the 1982 film Incomplete Eclipse, which was entered into the 33rd Berlin International Film Festival.

In recent years Navrátil has become a well-known, albeit reclusive, soap opera star. On 6 February 2018, Navrátil announced his candidacy for Senate at Třebíč district. He is a candidate of TOP 09.

Selected filmography
 Incomplete Eclipse (1982)
 How the World Is Losing Poets (1982)
 Povídka s dobrým koncem (1986)
 Dobří holubi se vracejí (1987)
 Lotrando a Zubejda (1997)
 Jak básníci neztrácejí naději (2004)
 The City of the Sun (2005)
 Rafťáci (2006)
 Ďáblova lest (2009)

References

External links
 

1952 births
Living people
Czech male film actors
Czech male stage actors
People from Třebíč
TOP 09 politicians
Janáček Academy of Music and Performing Arts alumni